Mastakh 2-y (pronounced Mastakh Vtoroy) is a rural locality (a selo), and one of three settlements in Luchcheginsky 2-y Rural Okrug of Kobyaysky District in the Sakha Republic, Russia, in addition to Mastakh, the administrative center of the Rural Okrug and Byranattalakh. Its population as of the 2002 Census was 23.

References

Notes

Sources
Official website of the Sakha Republic. Registry of the Administrative-Territorial Divisions of the Sakha Republic. Kobyaysky District. 

Rural localities in Kobyaysky District